Torquay Hotel Co Ltd v Cousins [1968] EWCA Civ 2 (BAILII)  is a UK labour law case concerning the liability of a union when its members take industrial action.

In it Lord Denning MR invented a new economic tort for interference with a contract. This was not there before, because economic torts had only existed where the result of some action was unlawful, for instance the breach of a contract, intimidation (see Tarleton v McGawley (1793) 1 Peake 270) or conspiracy to injure. The House of Lords has subsequently rejected the existence of a separate tort for interference with a contract which can be constituted without unlawful actions or without a contractual breach.

Facts
Torquay Hotel Co Ltd had a contract for the supply of oil from Esso Petroleum Co Ltd. It contained a force majeure clause. The Transport and General Workers Union went on strike and blocked that supply. There was therefore no breach of contract by the Esso for failing to deliver. Torquary Hotel nevertheless sued the union, of which Mr Frank Cousins was the general secretary.

Lord Denning MR set out the facts in his judgment.

Judgment
Lord Denning MR held that for the purpose of the trade union's liability, they were unable to rely on that clause to absolve themselves from liability for the economic loss they caused. The interference with the supply contract was enough to visit liability, even though under the plain meaning of the contract, there was no breach. His decision ran as follows.

See also
UK labour law
DHN Food Distributors Ltd v Tower Hamlets London Borough Council [1976] 1 WLR 852

Notes

English tort case law
United Kingdom labour case law
Court of Appeal (England and Wales) cases
1968 in British law
1968 in case law
United Kingdom trade union case law
United Kingdom strike case law
1968 in labor relations